Sample size determination is the act of choosing the number of observations or replicates to include in a statistical sample. The sample size is an important feature of any empirical study in which the goal is to make inferences about a population from a sample. In practice, the sample size used in a study is usually determined based on the cost, time, or convenience of collecting the data, and the need for it to offer sufficient statistical power. In complicated studies there may be several different sample sizes: for example, in a stratified survey there would be different sizes for each stratum. In a census, data is sought for an entire population, hence the intended sample size is equal to the population. In experimental design, where a study may be divided into different treatment groups, there may be different sample sizes for each group.

Sample sizes may be chosen in several ways:
using experience – small samples, though sometimes unavoidable, can result in wide confidence intervals and risk of errors in statistical hypothesis testing.
using a target variance for an estimate to be derived from the sample eventually obtained, i.e., if a high precision is required (narrow confidence interval) this translates to a low target variance of the estimator.
using a target for the power of a statistical test to be applied once the sample is collected.
using a confidence level, i.e. the larger the required confidence level, the larger the sample size (given a constant precision requirement).

Introduction

Larger sample sizes generally lead to increased precision when estimating unknown parameters. For example, if we wish to know the proportion of a certain species of fish that is infected with a pathogen, we would generally have a more precise estimate of this proportion if we sampled and examined 200 rather than 100 fish.  Several fundamental facts of mathematical statistics describe this phenomenon, including the law of large numbers and the central limit theorem.

In some situations, the increase in precision for larger sample sizes is minimal, or even non-existent. This can result from the presence of systematic errors or strong dependence in the data, or if the data follows a heavy-tailed distribution.

Sample sizes may be evaluated by the quality of the resulting estimates. For example, if a proportion is being estimated, one may wish to have the 95% confidence interval be less than 0.06 units wide.  Alternatively, sample size may be assessed based on the power of a hypothesis test. For example, if we are comparing the support for a certain political candidate among women with the support for that candidate among men, we may wish to have 80% power to detect a difference in the support levels of 0.04 units.

Estimation

Estimation of a proportion

A relatively simple situation is estimation of a proportion. For example, we may wish to estimate the proportion of residents in a community who are at least 65 years old.

When the observations are independent, this estimator has a (scaled) binomial distribution (and is also the sample mean of data from a Bernoulli distribution). The maximum variance of this distribution is 0.25, which occurs when the true parameter is p = 0.5. In practice, since p is unknown, the maximum variance is often used for sample size assessments. If a reasonable estimate for p is known the quantity  may be used in place of 0.25.

For sufficiently large n, the distribution of  will be closely approximated by a normal distribution. Using this and the Wald method for the binomial distribution, yields a confidence interval of the form

 ,
where Z is a standard Z-score for the desired level of confidence (1.96 for a 95% confidence interval).

If we wish to have a confidence interval that is W units total in width (W/2 on each side of the sample mean), we will solve

for n, yielding the sample size

 , in the case of using .5 as the most conservative estimate of the proportion.  (Note: W/2 = margin of error.)

In the figure below one can observe how sample sizes for binomial proportions change given different confidence levels and margins of error.

Otherwise, the formula would be   , which yields   .

For example, if we are interested in estimating the proportion of the US population who supports a particular presidential candidate, and we want the width of 95% confidence interval to be at most 2 percentage points (0.02), then we would need a sample size of (1.96)2/ (0.022) = 9604.  It is reasonable to use the 0.5 estimate for p in this case because the presidential races are often close to 50/50, and it is also prudent to use a conservative estimate.  The margin of error in this case is 1 percentage point (half of 0.02).

The foregoing is commonly simplified 

will form a 95% confidence interval for the true proportion. If this interval needs to be no more than W units wide, the equation

can be solved for n, yielding n = 4/W2 = 1/B2 where B is the error bound on the estimate, i.e., the estimate is usually given as within ± B. For B = 10% one requires n = 100, for B = 5% one needs n = 400, for B = 3% the requirement approximates to n = 1000, while for B = 1% a sample size of n = 10000 is required. These numbers are quoted often in news reports of opinion polls and other sample surveys. However, the results reported may not be the exact value as numbers are preferably rounded up. Knowing that the value of the n is the minimum number of  sample points needed to acquire the desired result, the number of respondents then must lie on or above the minimum.

Estimation of a mean
When estimating the population mean using an independent and identically distributed (iid) sample of size n, where each data value has variance σ2, the standard error of the sample mean is:

This expression describes quantitatively how the estimate becomes more precise as the sample size increases.  Using the central limit theorem to justify approximating the sample mean with a normal distribution yields a confidence interval of the form

 , 
where Z is a standard Z-score for the desired level of confidence (1.96 for a 95% confidence interval).

If we wish to have a confidence interval that is W units total in width (W/2 being the margin of error on each side of the sample mean), we would solve

for n, yielding the sample size

.

Required sample sizes for hypothesis tests 
A common problem faced by statisticians is calculating the sample size required to yield a certain power for a test, given a predetermined Type I error rate α. As follows, this can be estimated by pre-determined tables for certain values, by Mead's resource equation, or, more generally, by the cumulative distribution function:

Tables

The table shown on the right can be used in a two-sample t-test to estimate the sample sizes of an experimental group and a control group that are of equal size, that is, the total number of individuals in the trial is twice that of the number given, and the desired significance level is 0.05. The parameters used are:
The desired statistical power of the trial, shown in column to the left.
Cohen's d (= effect size), which is the expected difference between the means of the target values between the experimental group and the control group, divided by the expected standard deviation.

Mead's resource equation
Mead's resource equation is often used for estimating sample sizes of laboratory animals, as well as in many other laboratory experiments. It may not be as accurate as using other methods in estimating sample size, but gives a hint of what is the appropriate sample size where parameters such as expected standard deviations or expected differences in values between groups are unknown or very hard to estimate.

All the parameters in the equation are in fact the degrees of freedom of the number of their concepts, and hence, their numbers are subtracted by 1 before insertion into the equation.

The equation is:

where:
N is the total number of individuals or units in the study (minus 1)
B is the blocking component, representing environmental effects allowed for in the design (minus 1)
T is the treatment component, corresponding to the number of treatment groups (including control group) being used, or the number of questions being asked (minus 1)
E is the degrees of freedom of the error component and should be somewhere between 10 and 20.

For example, if a study using laboratory animals is planned with four treatment groups (T=3), with eight animals per group, making 32 animals total (N=31), without any further stratification (B=0), then E would equal 28, which is above the cutoff of 20, indicating that sample size may be a bit too large, and six animals per group might be more appropriate.

Cumulative distribution function
Let Xi, i = 1, 2, ..., n be independent observations taken from a normal distribution with unknown mean μ and known variance σ2. Consider two hypotheses, a null hypothesis:

 

and an alternative hypothesis:

 

for some 'smallest significant difference' μ* > 0. This is the smallest value for which we care about observing a difference. Now, if we wish to (1) reject H0 with a probability of at least 1 − β when
Ha is true (i.e. a power of 1 − β), and (2) reject H0 with probability α when H0 is true, then we need the following:

If zα is the upper α percentage point of the standard normal distribution, then

 

and so

 'Reject H0 if our sample average is more than '

is a decision rule which satisfies (2). (This is a 1-tailed test.)

Now we wish for this to happen with a probability at least 1 − β when
Ha is true. In this case, our sample average will come from Normal distribution with mean μ*. Therefore, we require

 

Through careful manipulation, this can be shown (see Statistical power Example) to happen when

 

where  is the normal cumulative distribution function.

Stratified sample size
With more complicated sampling techniques, such as stratified sampling, the sample can often be split up into sub-samples. Typically, if there are H such sub-samples (from H different strata) then each of them will have a sample size nh, h = 1, 2, ..., H. These nh must conform to the rule that n1 + n2 + ... + nH = n (i.e., that the total sample size is given by the sum of the sub-sample sizes). Selecting these nh optimally can be done in various ways, using (for example) Neyman's optimal allocation.

There are many reasons to use stratified sampling: to decrease variances of sample estimates, to use partly non-random methods, or to study strata individually. A useful, partly non-random method would be to sample individuals where easily accessible, but, where not, sample clusters to save travel costs.

In general, for H strata, a weighted sample mean is
 
with

 

 

which can be made a minimum if the sampling rate within each stratum is made

An "optimum allocation" is reached when the sampling rates within the strata
are made directly proportional to the standard deviations within the strata
and inversely proportional to the square root of the sampling cost per element
within the strata, :
 

where  is a constant such that , or, more generally, when

Qualitative research
Sample size determination in qualitative studies takes a different approach. It is generally a subjective judgment, taken as the research proceeds. One approach is to continue to include further participants or material until saturation is reached. The number needed to reach saturation has been investigated empirically.

There is a paucity of reliable guidance on estimating sample sizes before starting the research, with a range of suggestions given. A tool akin to a quantitative power calculation, based on the negative binomial distribution, has been suggested for thematic analysis.

See also

Design of experiments
Engineering response surface example under Stepwise regression
Cohen's h

References

General references

Rens van de Schoot, Milica Miočević (eds.). 2020. Small Sample Size Solutions (Open Access): A Guide for Applied Researchers and Practitioners. Routledge.

Further reading
 NIST: Selecting Sample Sizes
 ASTM E122-07: Standard Practice for Calculating Sample Size to Estimate, With Specified Precision, the Average for a Characteristic of a Lot or Process

External links
 A MATLAB script implementing Cochran's sample size formula

Sampling (statistics)

de:Zufallsstichprobe#Stichprobenumfang